Ursula Howells (17 September 1922 – 16 October 2005) was an English actress whose elegant presence kept her much in demand for roles in film and television.

Life and career
Howells was born in London, the daughter of composer Herbert Howells, and was educated at St Paul's Girls' School, where her father worked as Director of Music. She made her first stage appearance at Dundee in 1939, in John Drinkwater's Bird in Hand, then moved to Oxford in 1942 and three years later made her London debut at the Embassy Theatre, Swiss Cottage. In 1947, she appeared in the comedy  Jane at the Aldwych Theatre. After several years in the West End, and a brief stint on Broadway where she appeared in Springtime for Henry in 1951, she began to appear in films.

After the death of her father in 1983, Ursula Howells instigated the Herbert Howells Society in 1987, and became a standard bearer for the promotion of his work. She financially supported the recording of his compositions and did much to encourage the publishing and promotion of church music.

Howells died on 16 October 2005, aged 83.

Filmography

Film

 Flesh and Blood (1951) - Harriet Marshall
 I Believe in You (1952) - Hon. Ursula
 The Oracle (1953) - Peggy
 The Weak and the Wicked (1954) - Pam Vickers
 The Gilded Cage (1955) - Brenda Lucas
 The Constant Husband (1955) - 'The Wives' - Ann
 Track the Man Down (1955) - Mary Dennis
 They Can't Hang Me (1955) - Antonia Pitt
 Handcuffs, London (1955) - Madelaine Perry
 Keep It Clean (1956) - Pat Anstey
 The Long Arm (1956) - Mrs. Elliot / Mrs. Gilson
 West of Suez (1957) - Eileen
 Account Rendered (1957) - Lucille Ainsworth
 Two Letter Alibi (1962) - Louise Hilary
 80,000 Suspects (1963) - Joanna Duten
 The Sicilians (1964) - Mme. Perrault
 Dr Terror's House of Horrors (1965) - Mrs. Deirdre Biddulph (segment "Werewolf")
 Torture Garden (1967) - Miss Maxine Chambers (segment 3 "Mr. Steinway")
 Assignment K (1968) - Estelle
 Crossplot (1969) - Maggi Thwaites
 Mumsy, Nanny, Sonny and Girly (1970) - Mumsy
 Father, Dear Father (1973) - Barbara
 The Tichborne Claimant (1998) - Lady Doughty

Television

 Madhouse on Castle Street (1963) - Martha Tompkins
 Dixon of Dock Green (1963) - Jean Baker Ellis
 The Forsyte Saga (1967) - Frances
 Man in a Suitcase (1968) - Clara Arnoldson
 Father, Dear Father (1968-1973) - Barbara Mossman
 Upstairs, Downstairs (1975) - Duchess of Buckminster
 The Barchester Chronicles (1982) - Miss Thorne
 Miss Marple - A Murder is Announced (1985) - Miss Blacklock
 Bergerac (1985-1991) - Laura Atherton / Elizabeth Fouchet
 Casualty (1993-1997) - Erica Chisnall / Hilda
 Lovejoy (1994) - Olive Nettleton
 Under the Hammer (1994) -  Mrs. Roper
 Heartbeat (1995) - Miriam Wakefield
 Dangerfield (1995) - Violet Trevelyn
 A Rather English Marriage (1998, TV Movie) - Mary
 The Cazalets (2001) - Kitty Cazalet
 Midsomer Murders- The Electric Vendetta (2001) - Lady Isabel Aubrey (final appearance)

References

External links
 
 The Herbert Howells Trust

1922 births
2005 deaths
English film actresses
English television actresses
People educated at St Paul's Girls' School
Actresses from London
20th-century English actresses
21st-century English actresses
Ursula